The 2020–21 Ukrainian Cup  was the 30th annual season of Ukraine's football knockout competition. The competition started on 26 August 2020 and concluded on 13 May 2021 with the final at the Ternopilsky Misky Stadion in Ternopil.

All competition rounds consisted of a single game with a home field advantage granted to a team from lower league. Draw for all the rounds was blind. Qualification for the competition was granted to all professional clubs and finalists of the 2019–20 Ukrainian Amateur Cup.

This season was the first, when two teams started the competition from the quarter-final stage: the defending winners (Dynamo Kyiv) and the champions of Ukraine of the previous season (Shakhtar Donetsk).

Dynamo Kyiv won their joint-record 13th Ukrainian Cup title after beating Zorya Luhansk 1–0 in extra time in the final. They therefore qualified to the play-off round of the 2020–21 UEFA Europa League, however they qualified for the Champions League through league season.

Due to the ongoing COVID-19 pandemic, access of spectators to stadium was limited, but was allowed to one of postponed games (matches) of the first preliminary round on 9 September 2020 at Slavutych Arena.

Team allocation and schedule 
The competition includes all professional first teams from the Premier League (14/14 teams of the league), First League (16/16), Second League (23/27) and two best teams from the previous year's Amateur Cup. Three second club teams from the Second League are not eligible for the tournament, FC Kalush did not participate.

Rounds schedule

Competition schedule 
Legends: AM – AAFU (amateur) competitions (IV tier), 2L – Second League (III tier), 1L – First League (II tier), PL – Premier League (I tier)

First preliminary round (1/64) 
In this round, 13 clubs from the First League, 23 clubs from the Second League and both finalists of the 2019–20 Ukrainian Amateur Cup entered the competition.

The draw was held on 21 August 2020.

Notes

Second preliminary round (1/32) 
In this round, 3 clubs from the First League entered the competition and joined the 19 winners of the First preliminary round (11 clubs from First League, 7 – Second League, 1 – amateurs).

The draw was held on 10 September 2020.

Third preliminary round (1/16) 
In this round, 11 clubs from the Premier League will enter the competition and join the 11 winners of the Second preliminary round (7 clubs from First League, 3 – Second League, 1 – amateurs).

The draw was held on 18 September 2020.

Notes:

Round of 16 (1/8) 
In this round, Zorya Luhansk from the Premier League will enter the competition and join the 11 winners of the Third preliminary round (8 clubs from Premier League, 3 – First League, 1 – Second League).

The draw was held on 27 October 2020. The game Desna – Zorya was postponed to 16 December 2020.

Quarter-finals (1/4) 
In this round, Shakhtar Donetsk and Dynamo Kyiv from the Premier League will enter the competition and join the 6 winners of the Round of 16 (4 clubs from Premier League, 2 – First League).

The draw was held on 18 December 2020.<ref>All pairs of contestants are known (Відбулося жеребкування 1/4 фіналу Кубку України. Відомі всі пари суперників). UA-Football. 18 December 2020</ref>

 Semi-finals (1/2) 

The base date for matches of this round is 21 April 2021. The draw was held on 4 March 2021.

 Final 

The city of Ternopil hosted its first Ukrainian Cup final at Ternopilsky Misky Stadion and first major competition final overall, after the previous season's final was initially moved from Ternopil to Lviv and then moved again to Kharkiv due to the COVID-19 pandemic in Ukraine.UAF Executive Committee approves Ternopil city stadium as the venue for the Cup Final of Ukraine-2019/2020 . Ukrainian Association of Football. 16 December 2019

Bracket
The following is the bracket which the main stage of the Ukrainian Cup resembles. Numbers in parentheses next to the match score represent the results of a penalty shoot-out.

 Top goalscorers 
The competition's top ten goalscorers including preliminary rounds.Notes:''

See also 
2020–21 Ukrainian Premier League
2020–21 Ukrainian First League
2020–21 Ukrainian Second League
2020–21 Ukrainian Amateur Cup

References

Cup
Ukrainian Cup
Ukrainian Cup seasons